The 1928 United States presidential election in Michigan took place on November 6, 1928, as part of the 1928 United States presidential election. Voters chose 15 representatives, or electors, to the Electoral College, who voted for president and vice president.

Michigan voted for Republican nominees Herbert Hoover of California and his running mate Charles Curtis in a landslide. The ticket received slightly over 70% of the popular vote compared to Democrats Al Smith of New York and Joseph T. Robinson's 28.92%.

With 70.36% of the popular vote, Michigan would prove to be Hoover's second strongest victory in the nation after Kansas. This is also the last time any presidential candidate has won every single county in the state.

As of the 2020 presidential election, this remains the last time a Republican presidential candidate carried Wayne County, home of Michigan's most populated city, Detroit.

Results

Results by county

See also
 United States presidential elections in Michigan

References

Michigan
1928
1928 Michigan elections